DEP Domain Containing Protein 7 (DEPDC7) is a protein of unknown function located on chromosome 11 bases 33,015,863-33,033,581. The cytogenetic location is 11p13. DEPDC7 has several aliases: DEP Domain Containing 7, DJ85M6.4, Novel 58.3 KDA Protein, Protein TR2/D15, and TR2. The DEPDC7 gene is 17,718 base pairs long and has 8 exons and 9 introns. The gene is capable of making 6 different mRNA transcripts.  Two functional domains can be found within this gene's sequence: DEP (Dishevelled, Egl-10, and Pleckstrin) domain and RhoGAP domain.

mRNA 
Transcription produces 4 alternatively spliced variants and 2 unspliced forms. Isoform 1 is the longest of all the variants containing all 8 exons. It codes for 511 amino acids. Northern blot analysis detected that the DEPDC7 transcript in humans was expressed highly in the liver and moderately expressed in the kidney. Hypomethylation of one of the DEPDC7 introns was related to the appearance of depression symptoms.

Protein 

The protein is 511 amino acids long and has a molecular weight of 58310. DEPDC7 could have a role in tumor suppression. Overexpression inhibits the proliferation of hepatoma cells blocks the cell cycle transition from the G0/G1 to S phase, and inhibits the migration and invasion of hematoma cells. DEPDC7 could potentially regulate neural development and physiology  and could participate in epigenetic processes of striatal neurons. Genomic rearrangement within 11p12 and 11p14 were associated with WAGR syndrome.

DEP Domain 
DEP domain is named after the 3 proteins it was initially found in: Dishevelled, Egl-10, and Pleckstrin. Dishevelled plays a key role in the transduction of the Wg/Wnt signal. This signal goes from the cell surface to the nucleus. Dishevelled is a segment polarity protein needed to make coherent arrays of polarized cells and segments in embryos. It also plays a role in wingless signaling. Egl-10 regulates G-protein signaling in the central nervous system. Pleckstrin has 2 PH domains flanking the DEP domain and is the major substrate of protein kinase C in platelets. The DEP domain within DEPDC7 was found to bind with CARMA2 and CARMA3 proteins.

Paralog 
DEPDC7 has a paralog: DEPDC1B, a protein coding gene.

References 

Genes on human chromosome 11